The 2018 Kildare Senior Football Championship is the 125th edition of the Kildare GAA's premier club Gaelic football tournament for senior graded teams in County Kildare, Ireland. The tournament consists of 16 teams with the winner going on to represent Kildare in the Leinster Senior Club Football Championship. The championship had a different format this year, employing a random draw for the first round, followed by seeded groups and a knock-out stage.

Moorefield were the defending champions after they defeated Celbridge in the previous years final. 

This was Raheens' return to the senior grade after 12 years outside the top-flight of Kildare club football.

Team Changes

The following teams have changed division since the 2017 championship season.

To S.F.C.
Promoted from 2017 Kildare I.F.C.
 Raheens  -  (Intermediate Champions)

From S.F.C.
Relegated to 2018 Kildare I.F.C.
 Allenwood

Format
The 2018 Senior and Intermediate County Championship used a completely new format this year. 16 teams play in eight first round games after which all 16 teams will go into four groups of four with two winners and two losers from the opening round in each of those groups.
After which the teams that finish first and second will qualify for the knockout stages while the four bottom clubs have to fend off relegation in a Relegation Semi-Final.

First round
 Johnstownbridge 1-14, 0-11 Confey, St. Conleth's Park, 4/5/2018,
 Celbridge 2-18, 1-12 Castledermot, Hawkfield, 5/5/2018,
 Athy 0-23, 2-12 Maynooth, Hawkfield, 5/5/2018,
 St. Laurence's 2-15, 1-10 Clane, St. Conleth's Park, 5/5/2018,
 Naas 0-25, 0-10 Round Towers, St. Conleth's Park, 5/5/2018,
 Leixlip 1-10, 1-10 Eadestown, St. Conleth's Park, 6/5/2018,
 Moorefield 0-22, 4-8 Carbury, St. Conleth's Park, 6/5/2018,

 Leixlip 2-20, 3-5 Eadestown, Hawkfield, 9/5/2018, (Replay)

Group stage
All 16 teams play in the group stage. There are four groups of four, with each group consisting of 2 First Round winners and losers. The top team in each group go into the Quarter-Finals, 2nd and 3rd in each group proceed to the Preliminary Quarter-Finals while the bottom team of each group entered a Relegation Playoff.

Group A

Round 1
 St. Laurence's 1-16, 0-7 Maynooth, 17/8/2018,
 Naas 1-14, 0-14 Castledermot, 18/8/2018,

Round 2
 Castledermot 2-16, 2-11 St. Laurence's, 24/8/2018,
 Naas 1-24, 2-13 Maynooth, 1/9/2018,

Round 3
 St. Laurence's 3-11, 0-13 Naas, 9/9/2018,
 Maynooth 4-7, 0-14 Castledermot, 9/9/2018,

Group B

Round 1
 Round Towers 3-13, 3-7 Leixlip, 17/8/2018,
 Athy 1-22, 0-15 Carbury, 18/8/2018,

Round 2
 Athy 0-14, 1-9 Round Towers, 25/8/2018,
 Carbury 5-14, 1-9 Leixlip, 1/9/2018,

Round 3
 Athy 0-13, 0-6 Leixlip, 8/9/2018,
 Carbury 2-14, 1-11 Round Towers, 8/9/2018,

Group C

Round 1
 Moorefield 3-16, 2-11 Raheens, 18/8/2018,
 Johnstownbridge 6-13, 0-13 Clane, 18/8/2018,

Round 2
 Johnstownbridge 1-17, 1-13 Raheens, 1/9/2018,
 Moorefield 3-23, 0-8 Clane, 1/9/2018,

Round 3
 Clane 4-9, 4-9 Raheens, 9/9/2018,
 Moorefield 0-14, 2-5 Johnstownbridge, 9/9/2018,

Group D

Round 1
 Celbridge 4-21, 0-7 Eadestown, 18/8/2018,
 Sarsfields 2-18, 0-6 Confey, 18/8/2018,

Round 2
 Sarsfields 4-19, 1-8 Eadestown, 25/8/2018,
 Celbridge 1-21, 1-6 Confey, 1/9/2018,

Round 3
 Celbridge 0-13, 0-9 Sarsfields, 8/9/2018,
 Confey 0-13, 1-8 Eadestown, 8/9/2018,

Knock-out stage

Preliminary quarter-finals

Quarter-finals

Semi-finals

Final

Relegation playoff

Relegation semi-finals

 Eadestown 1-11, 0-10 Leixlip, Hawkfield, 22/9/2018,
 Castledermot 0-17, 0-11 Clane, Hawkfield, 22/9/2018,

Relegation final

 Clane 0-13, 0-12 Leixlip, Hawkfield, 6/10/2019,

Leinster Senior Club Football Championship

References

Kildare Senior Football Championship
Kildare Senior Football Championship
Kildare SFC